Peiresc may refer to:

Nicolas-Claude Fabri de Peiresc (1580–1637), French astronomer, antiquary and savant
19226 Peiresc, an outer main-belt asteroid named after the astronomer
Peirescius (crater), a crater located in the southeastern part of the Moon, also named after the astronomer